Talman or Talmon is a surname. Notable people with the surname include:

Howard Parker Talman (1893–1961), American football player and coach
Jacob Talmon (1916–1980), Israeli historian
Jeff Talman (born 1954), American artist
John Talman (1677–1726), British art collector
Moshe Talmon (born 1950), Israeli psychotherapist
Shemaryahu Talmon (1920–2010), Israel sociologist
Stefi Talman (born 1958), Swiss shoe designer
Tim Talman (born 1965), American actor
William Talman (actor) (1915–1968), American actor
William Talman (architect) (1650–1719), British architect

See also
Tallman (surname)